Azerbaijani mythology are complex mythological representations of the Azerbaijani people.

Azerbaijani myths and legends were created on the basis of the people 's faith in mythical and semi-mythical beings - carriers of good and evil. Mythical unities such as Earth - Sky, Sea - Mountain, Water - Fire, Man - Beast, Tree - Flower, Wind - Mudflow, dominate the mythological system. Stories related to these unities were created as society developed. These stories characterize the early development of the people. These stories were transmitted orally over many centuries. Another group of mythical unities as separate stories became part of various Azerbaijani folklore genres.

Although the mythology of the Azerbaijani people was influenced by outside forces, it retained local colour. The mythology of Kumyk people is also interconnected.

The origins of some Azerbaijani myths lie in the epic monument Oguz-Name, as well as in the stories of the heroic epic of Oghuz epic Kitab Dede Korkud, which includes early Turkic representations and archaic views formed in the Caucasus.

References

Literature